Glendora is an under construction light rail station in the Los Angeles Metro Rail system. The station is located near the intersection of South Vermont Avenue and Ada Avenue along the Pasadena Subdivision right of way in Glendora, California. It will be served by the A Line. It is currently under construction as part of the Foothill Extension and is slated to open in 2025.

References

External links
Glendora station – Metro Gold Line Foothill Extension Construction Authority

Future Los Angeles Metro Rail stations
Railway stations scheduled to open in 2025
Glendora, California